The KL Marathon is an annual marathon event held in Kuala Lumpur, Malaysia. The event was established in 1989. It is supported by the Malaysian Amateur Athletics Union (MAAU), Federal Territory Amateur Athletics Association (FTAAA) and Kuala Lumpur City Hall. In the 26th edition of the marathon in 2017, close to 36,000 runners participated in the event.

Standard Chartered Bank is currently the primary sponsor of this event and has been branding it as the Standard Chartered KL Marathon since 2009.

Course
The current route was approved by the Association of International Marathons and Distance Races and International Association of Athletics Federations and it will be utilised until 2015.

The Dataran Merdeka is the starting and ending points of this marathon. Runners who participate this marathon will run through the notable places and landmarks in Kuala Lumpur such as National Mosque, National Museum, Kuala Lumpur Railway Station, KL Sentral, Mid Valley Megamall, Thean Hou Temple, Stadium Negara, Royal Selangor Golf Club, Bukit Bintang, Jalan Imbi, KL Tower, Petronas Twin Towers, Istana Budaya, PWTC, Parlimen Malaysia and end at Dataran Merdeka.

Roads that are affected by the marathon race route are closed to traffic throughout the duration of the race for runners' safety. Water stations are available in every two kilometres and there are 24 water stations throughout the 42-kilometre route. Volunteers and medical personnel are also on stand-by at every station.

Winners
This list of winners below only applies to Full Marathon (42 km) only.
Key:

Deaths and incidents
In 2010, a runner in the 10 km category collapsed and suffered a seizure. Lim Wei Yee, 25, died on the way to the hospital. In 2019, two participants were injured when a car had crashed into runners at the marathon after it ploughed through safety barriers.

Charity benefits
The marathon for charity purpose category that allows runners to raise funds for charity such as Seeing is Believing was first organised in Kuala Lumpur Marathon on 2009 under the name "Run For A Cause". During the first charity marathon, more than RM 500,000 has been earned from the event. Starting 2010, five organisation such as Malaysian Association for the Blind (MAB), Malaysian AIDS Foundation (MAF), National Cancer Society of Malaysia (NCSM), Children's Environmental Heritage Foundation (YAWA) and Standard Chartered Trust Funds (SCTF) will be also benefited by the charity earned from this marathon event. In addition, the Corporate Challenge, similar to "Run For A Reason" charity marathon category was also introduced but this category is open to the company that run in a team. In 2011 marathon, a total of RM 486,668 has been raised for charity purpose. The contributor to the 2011 marathon charity fund will include the company Petronas Chemicals Group (RM 30,000) and Freescale Semiconductor (Malaysia) (RM 20,000).

References

External links
Official site of KL Marathon

Standard Chartered
Marathons in Malaysia
Sport in Kuala Lumpur
Recurring sporting events established in 2009